The women's 100 metre backstroke was a swimming event held as part of the swimming at the 1928 Summer Olympics programme. It was the second appearance of the event, which was established in 1924. The competition was held on Thursday and Saturday, 9 and 11 August 1928.

Twelve swimmers from seven nations competed.

Records
These were the standing world and Olympic records (in minutes) prior to the 1928 Summer Olympics.

In the first heat Ellen King equalized the world record with 1:22.0 minutes. In the second heat Marie Braun bettered the world record to 1:21.6 minutes.

Results

Heats

Thursday 9 August 1928: The fastest two in each heat and the fastest third-placed from across the heats advanced to the final.

Heat 1

Heat 2

Heat 3

Final

Saturday 11 August 1928:

References

External links
Olympic Report
 

Swimming at the 1928 Summer Olympics
1928 in women's swimming
Swim